Street People  (also known as The Executors and The Sicilian Cross) is an Italian crime-action film directed in 1976 by Maurizio Lucidi. It was written, among others, by the French Connection 's screenwriter, Ernest Tidyman. It was released in United States by American International Pictures.

Cast 
 Roger Moore as Ulysses
 Stacy Keach as Charlie Hanson
 Ivo Garrani as Salvatore Francesco
 Fausto Tozzi as Nicoletta
 Ennio Balbo as Continenza
 Loretta Persichetti as Hannah
 Peter Martell	as Pano
 Luigi Casellato as Pete
 Ettore Manni as Bishop Lopetri
 Rosemarie Lindt as Salvatore's girlfriend

Production 
Street People was filmed at Incir-De Paolis in Rome and on location in San Francisco and Agrigento.

Release 
Street People was released theatrically in Italy on 30 March 1976 where it was distributed by Agora Cinematografica. It grossed a total of 458,098,620 Italian lire on its theatrical release.

Reception 
The Evening Independent's film critic Jim Moorehead wrote: "The problem [of the film] is that the story line makes very little sense. Same is true with the editing. Ditto the dialog".

See also 
 List of Italian films of 1976

Notes

References

External links 
 
 

1976 films
1970s crime action films
1970s buddy films
Italian crime action films
Italian buddy films
Mafia films
Films directed by Maurizio Lucidi
Films set in the United States
Films set in San Francisco
Films scored by Luis Bacalov
English-language Italian films
1970s English-language films
1970s Italian films